The 2006 Worcester City Council election took place on 4 May 2006 to elect members of Worcester City Council in Worcestershire, England. One third of the council was up for election and the Conservative Party stayed in overall control of the council.

After the election, the composition of the council was:
Conservative 18
Labour 11
Liberal Democrat 3
Independent 3

Background
45 candidates competed in the election for the 12 seats which were being contested. Before the election the Conservatives had a one-seat majority with 18 of the 35 councillors, as compared to 10 Labour, 4 independents and 3 Liberal Democrats.

Election result
The results saw the Conservatives defend what was regarded as their most marginal council in the country, however Labour did make one gain from an independent. The Conservatives were seen as having benefited from the troubles of the national Labour government which helped them stay in control of the council. Voter turnout was higher than expectations with Claines ward seeing a 49% turnout and Battenhall 43.1%.

Following the election the leader of the council, Stephen Inman, stood down and was succeeded by fellow Conservative councillor Simon Geraghty.

Ward results

References

2006
2006 English local elections
2000s in Worcestershire